Micrurus baliocoryphus is a species of coral snake in the family Elapidae. Like the other members of its family, it is venomous. It is found in South America.

References 

baliocoryphus
Snakes of South America
Reptiles of Argentina
Reptiles of Brazil
Reptiles of Paraguay
Reptiles described in 1862